Three Fat Men (Три толстяка) written in 1924, by Yury Olesha, was published in 1928.

It was the first revolutionary fairy tale in Soviet literature. The critical reaction at first was varied. V. Boichevsky in an article "How Stories For Children Should Not Be" saw it as a "sugarcoated" presentation of revolution. Anatoly Lunacharsky, however, saw in it "heart-felt apologetics by the artistic intelligentsia accepting the revolution".

Konstantin Stanislavki and the Moscow Art Theatre premiered a dramatic version of the story in May 1930. A ballet version with music by V. Oransky was presented in 1935. It has also been turned into an opera (composer, V. Rubin, 1956), a film, cartoon movies, diafilm (filmstrip), several comic versions, several radio versions, and a computer game.

Plot 
The events occur at an unnamed country on the brink of revolution. The power in the state is held by the Three Fat Men, wealthy oligarchs with monopoly on the state's natural resources. A long brewing resistance is led by two men: Prospero the Gunsmith and Tibul the Acrobat. During a major confrontation with the government's forces, Prospero is captured and is scheduled for execution. However, at the same time, guardsmen defectors wreck the doll of Tutti, the designated heir of the Fat Men. The doll is a marvelous creation, capable of singing, dancing, and looks like a real girl, even growing up like one. The Fat Men summon a famous scholar, Doctor Gaspar Arnery, and order him to fix the doll before the next day. The Doctor, unknown to them, is a sympathizer for the resistance, and had helped Tibul escape pursuit by the army.

Gaspar attempts to repair the doll, but finds out it's impossible to do in less than three days. Fortunately, he encounters Suok, a young girl who looks exactly like the broken doll, and convinces her to cooperate with him. She manages to get the key to Prospero's cage from Tutti. When she goes to release him during the night, she is spoken to by another prisoner, a fur-covered humanoid creature. The prisoner calls her by name and passes her a note before dying.

Suok releases Prospero, who manages to flee. This time the uprising is successful. After it ends, Tutti and Suok appear before the people and read out the note given by the prisoner. He was once a man named Toub, a great scholar who made the doll for Tutti at the Three Fat Men's order, to replace Suok, who was his twin sister. Suok was sold to the circus. Then the Fat Men demanded he replace Tutti's heart with an iron one, and, once he refused, caged him.

References

External links
 English translations of the book at Web Archive.

1928 Russian novels
Books about revolutions
Novels about coups d'état
Novels set in fictional countries
Russian fairy tales
Soviet novels
Works about rebellions